Staley Springs was a former unincorporated community located on the northwest shore of Henrys Lake in Fremont County, Idaho, United States, that is now part of the city of Island Park.

Description
The community was named after Ed Staley, an early settler in the area. Prior to his purchase of the site, it was known as Sawtell's Fish Farm.

Island Park is part of the Rexburg Micropolitan Statistical Area.

See also
 Flat Rock, Idaho
 Lake, Idaho
 Last Chance, Idaho

References

Unincorporated communities in Fremont County, Idaho
Unincorporated communities in Idaho
Island Park, Idaho
Rexburg, Idaho micropolitan area
Former populated places in Idaho